Vajihabad (also Romanized as Vajīhābād; also known as Darreh Rasūl and Darreh Sūl) is a village in Shirvan Rural District, in the Central District of Borujerd County, Lorestan Province, Iran. At the 2006 census, its population was 61, in 13 families.

References 

Towns and villages in Borujerd County